Daviesia sejugata is a species of flowering plant in the family Fabaceae and is endemic to southern Australia. It is a straggling, mostly glabrous shrub with spiny, ridged branchlets, scattered, sharply-pointed, narrowly elliptic phyllodes, and yellow, maroon, orange and dark purple flowers.

Description

Taxonomy and naming
Daviesia sejugata was first formally described in 1997 by Gregory T. Chandler and Michael Crisp in Australian Systematic Botany from specimens collected by David L. Jones near Cambridge, Tasmania in 1994. The specific epithet (sejugata) means "separated" or "disjunct".

Distribution and habitat
This bitter-pea grows in mallee-heath on the southern Yorke Peninsula and on Kangaroo Island in South Australia. In northern and eastern Tasmania and on King Island it is found in heathy forest.

References

sejugata
Flora of South Australia
Flora of Tasmania
Plants described in 1997
Taxa named by Michael Crisp